Rugby sevens at the 2013 Asian Youth Games was held at the Youth Olympic Sports Park Rugby Field, Nanjing, China from August 17 to 19, 2013.

Medalists

Medal table

Results

Boys

Preliminary round

Pool A

Pool B

Final round

Quarterfinals

5–8 placing

Semifinals

7–8 placing

5–6 placing

Bronze medal match

Gold medal match

Girls

Preliminary round

Final round

Semifinals

Bronze medal match

Gold medal match

References

 Boys – Competition Summary
 Girls – Competition Summary

External links
Official website

2013 rugby sevens competitions
2013 Asian Youth Games events
2013 Asian Youth Games